Mohan Munasinghe is a Sri Lankan physicist, engineer and economist with a focus on energy, water resources, sustainable development and climate change. He was the 2021 Blue Planet Prize Laureate, and Vice-Chair of the Intergovernmental Panel on Climate Change (IPCC), which shared the 2007 Nobel Peace Prize with former Vice-President of the United States Al Gore. Munasinghe is the Founder Chairman of the Munasinghe Institute for Development. He has also served as an honorary senior advisor to the government of Sri Lanka since 1980.

Education
Born in Sri Lanka, Prof. Munasinghe was educated at Royal College, Colombo. He received a BA (Hons.) in Engineering in 1967 and a MA later from the University of Cambridge. Thereafter he gained a SM and PE in Electrical Engineering from the Massachusetts Institute of Technology in 1970; a PhD in Solid State Physics from McGill University in 1973 and a MA in Development Economics from Concordia University in 1975. He has received several honorary doctorates, honoris causa.

Career
From 1982 to 1987, he was the Senior Advisor (Energy and Information Technology) to the President of Sri Lanka, helping to formulate and implement the national energy strategy and computer policy. He was founder chairman, Computer and Information Technology Council (CINTEC), and served on the Presidential Commission that determined national telecommunications policy. During this period, he also served as board member, Natural Resources, Energy and Science Authority of Sri Lanka; Governor, Arthur Clarke Centre for Modern Technology, Sri Lanka; and founder-President of the Sri Lanka Energy Managers Association. He was involved with the Intergovernmental Panel on Climate Change since its inception in 1988 and had served as Chancellor of the International Water Academy in Oslo. From 1990 to 1992 Munasinghe was Advisor to the US President's Council on Environmental Quality (PCEQ). Until 2002 he was a Senior Manager/Advisor at the World Bank.

As an academic, he serves as distinguished guest professor at the University of Peking, and visiting professor at the United Nations University in Tokyo. Formerly, he was Director-General and Professor of Sustainable Development at the Sustainable Consumption Institute, University of Manchester, and Institute Professor at the Vale Sustainable Development Institute, Federal University of Para, Brazil. He also served on the board of directors of Green Cross International and was a member of the Club of Rome.
He has authored or co-authored over 120 books and 400 journal articles. He is widely recognised for having first proposed the Sustainomics framework for making development more sustainable at the 1992 Earth Summit in Rio de Janeiro, and more recently for proposing the Millennium Consumption Goals at the United Nations. He was visiting professor at the Technische Universität Darmstadt.

Awards and honours
Listed are some key awards and honours Prof. Munasinghe has received;
 Blue Planet Prize Laureate (2021)
 Officer of the French Legion of Honour (2017)
 Eminence in Engineering Award 2014 - highest prize bestowed by the Institute of Engineers, apex Engineering body in Sri Lanka, for exceptional contributions to the profession of engineering and to sustainable development in Sri Lanka and worldwide.
 Anita Garibaldi Gold Medal for meritorious services to humanity (Brazilian government, 2007)
 Sarvodaya Award for Humanity, Peace and Development (2007)
 Vice-Chair of the Intergovernmental Panel on Climate Change (IPCC), which shared the 2007 Nobel Peace Prize (2007)
 Zayed International Prize for Environment (jointly with other authors) for contributions to the Millennium Ecosystem Assessment (2006)
 Order of Fellowship (honoris causa) of the Independent University of Bangladesh for exceptional contributions to energy, economics and environment (Bangladesh, 2005)
 Outstanding lifetime achievements award from 16 major professional bodies (Sri Lanka, 2003)
 Adelman-Frankel prize for unique and innovative contributions to energy research from the USAEE (US, 2003)
 Green award for exceptional contributions to sustainable development from the Int. Federation of Environmental Journalists (1998)
 International best treatise award and medal for sustainable water resource management presented at the 1994 World Water Congress (Abu Dhabi, 1994).
 Award for outstanding contributions to energy economics from the Int. Assoc. of Energy Economists (US, 1986)
Sinha Gold Medal for outstanding scientific achievement from the Lions Clubs International (Sri Lanka, 1985)
 Albert M. Grass Prize (MIT, US, 1968)
 J. W. Beauchamp Prize (IET, UK, 1966)

Bibliography
Prof. Munasinghe has authored over 120 academic books and 400 technical papers; . Publications include:

References

External links
MIND – Munasinghe Institute for Development – private, nonprofit organisation, established to play a key role in nurturing communities of scholars and practitioners who will address sustainable development issues worldwide and explore viable means of achieving this goal in Sri Lanka and elsewhere without compromising economic, environmental and socio-cultural integrity.
IPCC – Intergovernmental Panel on Climate Change
Personal website

Sinhalese academics
Sinhalese engineers
MIT School of Engineering alumni
Academics of the University of Manchester
Alumni of Royal College, Colombo
Concordia University alumni
McGill University Faculty of Science alumni
Alumni of the University of Cambridge
Living people
Year of birth missing (living people)
Academic staff of Technische Universität Darmstadt
Sri Lankan environmentalists